Samaritans  is a registered charity aimed at providing emotional support to anyone in emotional distress, struggling to cope or at risk of suicide throughout the United Kingdom and the Republic of Ireland, often through its telephone helpline. Its name derives from the biblical Parable of the Good Samaritan although the organisation itself is not religious.

Its international network exists under the name Befrienders Worldwide, which is part of the Volunteer Emotional Support Helplines (VESH) with Lifeline International and the International Federation of Telephone Emergency Services (IFOTES).

History

Samaritans was founded in 1953 by Rev. Chad Varah, a Church of England vicar in the Diocese of London. His inspiration came from an experience he had had some years earlier as a young curate in the Diocese of Lincoln. He had taken a funeral for a fourteen-year old girl who had committed suicide because she believed she had contracted an STD, when in reality she was menstruating. Varah placed an advertisement in a newspaper encouraging people to volunteer at his church, listening to people contemplating suicide.

The movement grew rapidly: within ten years there were 40 branches and now there are 201 branches across the UK and Ireland, deliberately organised without regard to national boundaries on the basis that a service which is not political or religious should not recognise political or sectarian divisions. Samaritans offers support through over 21,200 trained volunteers (2015) and is entirely dependent on voluntary support. The name was not originally chosen by Chad Varah: it was part of a headline to an article in the Daily Mirror newspaper on 7 December 1953 about Varah's work.

In 2004, Samaritans announced that volunteer numbers had reached a thirty-year low, and launched a campaign to recruit more young people (specifically targeted at ages 18–24) to become volunteers. The campaign was fronted by Phil Selway, drummer with the band Radiohead, himself a Samaritans volunteer.

In 2004, Chad Varah announced that he had become disillusioned with Samaritans. He said, "It's no longer what I founded. I founded an organisation to offer help to suicidal or equally desperate people. The last elected chairman re-branded the organisation. It was no longer to be an emergency service, it was to be emotional support". One in five calls to Samaritans are from someone with suicidal feelings. Samaritans' vision is that fewer people will die by suicide.

Services

The core of Samaritans' work is a telephone helpline, operating 24 hours a day, 365 days a year. Samaritans was the first 24-hour telephone helpline to be set up in the UK. In addition, the organisation offers a drop-in service for face-to-face discussion, undertakes outreach at festivals and other outdoor events, trains prisoners as "Listeners" to provide support within prisons, and undertakes research into suicide and emotional health issues.

Since 1994, Samaritans has also offered confidential email support. Initially operating from one branch, the service is now provided by 198 branches and co-ordinated from the organisation's head office. In 2011, Samaritans received over 206,000 emails, including many from outside the UK, and aims to answer each one within 24 hours.
In 2009, Ofcom introduced the first harmonised European numbers for harmonised services of social value, allocating 116 123 to Samaritans. This number is free to call from mobiles and landlines. From 22 September 2015, Samaritans has promoted 116123 as its main number, replacing the chargeable 0845 number previously advertised.

In 2014, Samaritans received 5,100,000 calls for help by phone, email, text, letter, minicom, Typetalk, face-to-face at a branch, through its work in prisons, and at local and national festivals and other events.

Samaritans volunteers are given rigorous training to be non-judgmental and empathetic. By listening and asking open questions, Samaritans volunteers try to help people explore their feelings and work out their own way forward.

Samaritans does not denounce suicide, and it is not necessary to be suicidal to contact Samaritans. In 2014, nearly 80% of the people calling Samaritans did not express suicidal feelings. Samaritans believes that offering people the opportunity to be listened to in confidence, and accepted without prejudice, can alleviate despair and make emotional health a mainstream issue.

In 2022 Samaritans is campaigning to have "suicide websites" shut down; it believes that the UK government’s proposed online safety bill "isn’t fit for purpose". Smaller "pro-suicide" websites which can push people to commit suicide are the charity's biggest concern in this area.

Media guidelines 
In 2013, following extensive consultation with journalists and editors throughout the industry, Samaritans produced a set of guidelines outlining best practice when reporting suicide. Since its publication, the organisation has received many awards in recognition of its work influencing the way in which suicide is reported.

Confidentiality
Samaritans have a strict code of caller confidentiality, even after the death of a caller. Unless the caller gives consent to pass on information, confidentiality will be broken only in rare circumstances, such as when Samaritans receives bomb or terrorism warnings, to call an ambulance because a caller appears to be incapable of making rational decisions, when the caller is threatening volunteers or deliberately preventing the service being delivered to other callers, or when there is a safeguarding concern.

In November 2011, the Board of Trustees agreed a motion breaking with confidentiality in the Republic of Ireland, "To provide confidential support to children but report to the Health Service Executive any contacts (from either adults or children) where it appears a child is experiencing specific situations such as those that can cause them serious harm from themselves or others."

In 2011, Facebook collaborated with Samaritans to offer help to people in distress. This led to 'cold case' calling, which some believed was an infringement on people's privacy. An Irish journalist wrote of her experience of receiving such a communication.

International reach

Through its email service, Samaritans' work has extended well beyond the UK and Ireland, as messages are received from all around the world.

Samaritans' international reach is through Befrienders Worldwide, an organisation of over 400 centres in 38 countries offering similar activities. Samaritans took on and renamed the Befrienders International network in 2003, a year after it collapsed. Some members of Befrienders Worldwide also use the name Samaritans; this includes centres in Hong Kong, India, Serbia, the United States and Zimbabwe.

The Volunteer Emotional Support Helplines (VESH) combines Samaritans (through Befrienders Worldwide) with the other two largest international services (IFOTES & Lifeline), and plans a combined international network of helplines. In their roles as emotional support service networks, they have all agreed to develop a more effective and robust international interface.

See also:

 The Samaritans Hong Kong (Multilingual Service)
 The Samaritan Befrienders Hong Kong
 Samaritans of Singapore
 Samaritans USA—this was formed in 2005 when Samaritans of Boston (established 1974) joined forces with their Framingham branch. Samaritans is also a certified member of Contact USA (a Lifeline International member). There are Samaritans offices in other regions of Massachusetts and the U.S. operating independently with a common mission and philosophy.

Similar charities

A number of other helplines exist that offer a similar service to Samaritans. These are often aimed at a specific sector/group of people.

One example is Nightline, a student-run listening and information services, based at universities across the country, offer a night time support service for students. Each service is run specifically for students at a particular university/geographical area, and most Nightlines are members of the Nightline Association, a registered charity in England, Wales and Scotland.

Shout is a free mental health helpline in the United Kingdom, providing the UK's first 24/7 text message support service for people who are struggling to cope.

In the UK, the ChildLine service operated by the NSPCC (National Society for the Prevention of Cruelty to Children) is similar to the Samaritans helpline in some ways, but offers support for children only. A similar service, also called Childline, is operated in Ireland by the Irish Society for the Prevention of Cruelty to Children (ISPCC).

Another example is Aware, a national voluntary organisation, based in Ireland, which provides supports to individuals who experience depression with their families and friends. It provides a Helpline service, as well as nationwide Support Groups and monthly lectures, which seek to educate and increase awareness of depression.

See also 
 Mental health in the United Kingdom
 Andy's Man Club  - Men's talking group

References

External links 

 (UK/Ireland-based)

Samaritans (USA) home page
Welcome to Befrienders Worldwide
Samaritans of Singapore is a non-profit and non-religious organisation which aims to provide 24-hour confidential emotional support to people in crisis, thinking of suicide or affected by suicide.

Charities based in the Republic of Ireland
Epsom and Ewell
Health charities in the United Kingdom
Health in Surrey
Mental health organisations in the United Kingdom
Organisations based in Surrey
Organizations established in 1953
Suicide prevention
1953 establishments in the United Kingdom
Crisis hotlines